Tekirdağ Province is a province of Turkey. It is located in the East Thrace region of the country, also known as European Turkey, one of only three provinces entirely within continental Europe. Tekirdağ Province is bordered by Istanbul Province to the east, Kırklareli Province to the north, Edirne Province to the west, and the Gallipoli peninsula of Çanakkale Province to the south.

Tekirdağ is the capital of the province, and the third largest city in European Turkey after Istanbul and Çorlu.

Agriculture
The province of Tekirdağ is one of Turkey's the most important regions for viticulture and winemaking. The coastline between Tekirdağ and Şarköy, particularly Mürefte, are notable centers of wineyards. 22 of the 27 villages of Şarköy grow grape and produce wine. There are well-known wine producers in the region, including "Doluca", "Gülor", "Kutman", "Bağcı" and "Latif Aral". Other wine producers of the region are "Melen" in Hoşköy, Şarköy and "Umurbey" in Tekirdağ.

Places of Interest 
 Şahinköy Church

Districts

References

External links

 Tekirdağ governor's official website 
 Tekirdağ municipality's official website 
 Tekirdağ weather forecast information